Barthe is a river of Mecklenburg-Vorpommern, Germany. The river has a length of about 35 kilometers. It discharges into the Barther Bodden, which is connected to the Baltic Sea.

See also
List of rivers of Mecklenburg-Vorpommern

Rivers of Mecklenburg-Western Pomerania
Rivers of Germany